Return of service can refer to:

Service of process
In tennis, a response to a serve